Robert Scott Donaldson was a Canadian politician who represented Lumsden on the Legislative Assembly of the province of Saskatchewan during the 9th sitting.

He also represented Thunder Creek from 1925 to 1929, and 1934 to 1938.

Career 
He defeated Harold Alexander Lilly in 1934.

Electoral history 

|-

|Conservative
|Claude H.J. Burrows
|align="right"|1,923
|align="right"|27.51%
|align="right"|-5.89

|CCF
|McDirmid Rankin
|align="right"|1,847
|align="right"|26.42%
|align="right"|+5.60

|- bgcolor="white"
!align="left" colspan=3|Total
!align="right"|6,990
!align="right"|100.00%
!align="right"|

References 

Saskatchewan Liberal Party MLAs
20th-century Canadian politicians